is a 2017 Japanese romance drama film directed by Naomi Kawase. It was selected to compete for the Palme d'Or in the main competition section at the 2017 Cannes Film Festival. At Cannes it won the Prize of the Ecumenical Jury.

Plot
Masako (Ayame Misaki) creates movie audio descriptions. Her passion and her commitment to her work leads her to create scripts full of colors and textures in order to make them as accessible as possible to blind audiences. She tests it on a group of 10 blind people. At one of the pre-premiere screenings, she meets Masaya (Masatoshi Nagase), a renowned photographer who gradually loses his sight and ability to practice his craft. Masaya's strong character makes him the only one to firmly criticize her scripts. He helps Masako see the coldness of her careful descriptions. Despite the differences that arise between them, both manage to create a strong relationship that allows them to explore a world previously invisible to their eyes. In the last scene of the film, the old man struggles to climb a small dune, at the top he stops facing the setting sun. This reflects the message transmitted by his impassive face without imposing a vision on the viewer.

Cast
Masatoshi Nagase as Masaya Nakamori
Ayame Misaki as Misako Ozaki
Noémie Nakai
Chihiro Ohtsuka
Kazuko Shirakawa
Tatsuya Fuji as Kitabayashi

Reception
The film received a 63% approval rating on Rotten Tomatoes, based on 27 reviews with an average rating of 6.17/10. It also holds a weighted average rating of 52 out of 100 on Metacritic, based on 5 critics, indicating "mixed or average reviews".

Clarence Tsui of The Hollywood Reporter said that "Radiance remains mired in underwritten relationships that end up less emotionally engaging than they appear". Guy Lodge of Variety magazine called the film "pretty" and "sincere".

References

External links

2017 romantic drama films
2010s Japanese-language films
Films directed by Naomi Kawase
Films about blind people
Films about photographers
Japanese romantic drama films
2010s Japanese films